Inger Stevens (born Ingrid Stensland; October 18, 1934 – April 30, 1970) was a Swedish-American film, stage and Golden Globe-winning television actress.

Early life 
Inger Stevens was born in Stockholm, Sweden, the eldest child of Per Gustaf and Lisbet Stensland. When she was six years old, her mother abandoned the family, taking her youngest son Peter with her. Soon after, Stevens' father moved to the United States, leaving Stevens and her brother Ola in the custody of the family maid and then later with an aunt in Lidingö, near Stockholm. In 1944, Stevens and her brother moved to the United States and lived with their father and his new wife in New York City where he was completing his PhD in Education at Columbia University. At age 13, Stevens moved with her family to Manhattan, Kansas, where her father taught at Kansas State University. Stevens attended Manhattan High School.

At 15, Stevens fled to Kansas City, where she worked in burlesque shows. At 18, she returned to New York City, where she worked as a chorus girl and in the Garment District while taking classes at the Actors Studio.

Career 

Stevens appeared on television series, in commercials and in plays until she received her big break in the film Man on Fire, starring Bing Crosby.

Roles in major films followed, including a starring role opposite Harry Belafonte in 1959's The World, the Flesh and the Devil, but she achieved her greatest success in the television series The Farmer's Daughter (1963–1966) with William Windom. Previously, Stevens had appeared in episodes of Bonanza, Route 66, The Alfred Hitchcock Hour, The Eleventh Hour, Sam Benedict, The Aquanauts and The Twilight Zone.

Following the cancellation of The Farmer's Daughter in 1966, Stevens appeared in several films: A Guide for the Married Man (1967), Hang 'Em High, 5 Card Stud and Madigan. At the time of her death, Stevens was attempting to revive her television career with the detective drama series The Most Deadly Game.

Personal life 
Stevens's first husband was her agent Anthony Soglio, to whom she was married from 1955 to 1957.

In January 1966, she was appointed to the advisory board of the UCLA Neuropsychiatric Institute by California governor Edmund G. "Pat" Brown. She also was named chairman of the California Council for Retarded Children. Her aunt was Karin Stensland Junker, author of The Child in the Glass Ball.

After Stevens's death, Ike Jones, the first black person to graduate from UCLA's School of Theater, Film and Television, revealed that he had secretly married Stevens in 1961 in Mexico. Some doubted Jones's claim because of the lack of a marriage license, the maintenance of separate homes and the filing of tax documents as single people. However, when Stevens's estate was being settled, her brother Carl O. Stensland confirmed in court that Stevens had hidden her marriage to Jones "out of fear for her career." Los Angeles Superior Court Commissioner A. Edward Nichols ruled in Jones's favor and named him administrator of her estate. A photo exists of the two attending a banquet together in 1968.

Death 
On the morning of April 30, 1970, Stevens's roommate and companion Lola McNally found Stevens on the kitchen floor of their Hollywood Hills home. According to McNally, Stevens opened her eyes, lifted her head and tried to speak but was unable to utter any sound. McNally told police that she had spoken to Stevens the previous night and had seen no signs of trouble. Stevens died in the ambulance on the way to the hospital. On arrival, medics removed a small bandage from her chin that revealed a small amount of fresh blood oozing from a cut that appeared to have been a few hours old. Los Angeles County coroner Dr. Thomas Noguchi attributed Stevens's death to "acute barbiturate poisoning" and the death was eventually ruled a suicide.

Filmography

Film 

Man on Fire (1957) — Nina Wylie
Cry Terror! (1958) — Mrs. Joan Molner
The Buccaneer (1958) — Annette Claiborne
The World, the Flesh and the Devil (1959) — Sarah Crandall
The New Interns (1964) — Nancy Terman
The Borgia Stick (1967, TV) — Eve Harrison
A Guide for the Married Man (1967) — Ruth Manning
A Time for Killing (1967) — Emily Biddle
Firecreek (1968) — Evelyn Pittman
Madigan (1968) — Julia Madigan
5 Card Stud (1968) — Lily Langford
Hang 'Em High (1968) — Rachel Warren
House of Cards (1968) — Anne de Villemont
A Dream of Kings (1969) — Anna

Television 

Kraft Television Theatre (1 episode, 1954)
Robert Montgomery Presents (1 episode, 1955)
Studio One (3 episodes, 1954–1955) — Lucy Henderson / Mary / Sue Ellen
Crunch and Des (1 episode, 1956) — The Actress
Matinee Theatre (1 episode, 1956)
Crusader as Alicia in "The Girl Across the Hall" (CBS, 1956) — Alicia
Conflict (1 episode, 1956) — Lady Arabella
The Joseph Cotten Show, or On Trial (1 episode, "Law Is for the Lovers", 1956) — Ruth
The Millionaire (1 episode, 1956) — Betty Perkins
Alfred Hitchcock Presents (1 episode, 1957) — Laura Ross
Climax! (1 episode, 1957) — Marge
Playhouse 90 (2 episodes, 1956–1959) — Gail Lucas / Johanna — Chambermaid
Bonanza (1 episode, 1959) — Emily Pennington
Sunday Showcase (1 episode, 1959) — Nina Kay
Dick Powell's Zane Grey Theatre (1 episode, 1960) — Beth Watkins
Moment of Fear (1 episode, 1960)
Checkmate (1 episode, 1960) — Betty Lyons
Hong Kong (1 episode, 1960) — Joan Blakely
The Twilight Zone
In "The Hitch-Hiker" Season 1 Episode 16 (CBS, 1960) — Nan Adams
In "The Lateness of the Hour", Season 2 Episode 8 (CBS, 1960) — Jana
Route 66 (2 episodes, 1960–1961) — Julie Brack / Wendy Durant
The DuPont Show of the Month (1 episode, 1961) — Princess Flavia
Adventures in Paradise (1 episode, 1961) — Dr. Britta Sjostrom
The Aquanauts (1 episode, 1961) — Margot Allison
The Detectives (1 episode, 1961) — Thea Templeton
Follow the Sun (2 episodes, 1961) — Lisa Mannheim / Abby Ellis
The Eleventh Hour (1 episode, 1962) — Christine Warren
Sam Benedict (1 episode, 1962) — Theresa Stone
The Dick Powell Show (2 episodes, 1962–1963) — Adele Hughes / Anna Beza
Your First Impression (1963) — Herself
The Alfred Hitchcock Hour (1 episode, 1963) — Karen Wilson
The Nurses (1 episode, 1963) — Clarissa Robin
Empire (1 episode, 1963) — Ellen Thompson
The Farmer's Daughter (102 episodes, 1963–1966) — Katy Holstrum / Katy Morley / Ann Carpenter
The Danny Kaye Show (1 episode, 1966) — Herself
The Smothers Brothers Comedy Hour (1 episode, 1967) — Eve Harrison
The Mask of Sheba (1970) — Sarah Kramer
Run, Simon, Run (1970) — Carroll Rennard
The Most Deadly Game (1 episode, 1970) — Vanessa Smith

Broadway credits 
Debut (1956)
Roman Candle (1960)
Mary, Mary (1962)

Awards and nominations

References

Further reading

External links 

1934 births
1970 deaths
1970 suicides
Actresses from Kansas
Actresses from Stockholm
American film actresses
American stage actresses
American television actresses
Best Musical or Comedy Actress Golden Globe (television) winners
Drug-related suicides in California
Barbiturates-related deaths
People from Manhattan, Kansas
Swedish emigrants to the United States
20th-century American actresses
Female suicides
20th-century Swedish women